Heathcote, an electoral district of the Legislative Assembly in the Australian state of New South Wales, has had two incarnations, the first from 1971 to 1991, the second from 1999 to the present.


Members for Heathcote

Election results

Elections in the 2010s

2019

2015

2011

Elections in the 2000s

2007

2003

Elections in the 1990s

1999

1991 & 1995
District abolished

Elections in the 1980s

1988

1987 by-election

1984

1981

Elections in the 1970s

1978

1976

1973

1971

Notes

References

New South Wales state electoral results by district